Słonne Mountains Landscape Park (Park Krajobrazowy Gór Słonnych) is a protected area (Landscape Park) in south-eastern Poland, established in 1992, covering an area of . It lies in the Słonne Mountains (literally "salt (brine) mountains") in the Eastern Carpathians (Carpathian Plateau).

Administratively the Park is within Subcarpathian Voivodeship: in Bieszczady County (Gmina Ustrzyki Dolne), Lesko County (Gmina Lesko, Gmina Olszanica) and Sanok County (Gmina Sanok, Gmina Tyrawa Wołoska).

Within the Landscape Park are nine nature reserves.

References 

Landscape parks in Poland
Protected areas of the Eastern Carpathians
Parks in Podkarpackie Voivodeship